Peter Orseolo, or Peter the Venetian (1010 or 1011 – 1046, or late 1050s), was the King of Hungary twice. He first succeeded his uncle, King Stephen I, in 1038. His favoritism towards his foreign courtiers caused an uprising which ended with his 1041 deposition. Peter was restored in 1044 by Henry III, Holy Roman Emperor. He accepted the Emperor's suzerainty during his second reign, which ended in 1046 after a pagan uprising. Hungarian chronicles are unanimous that Peter was executed by order of his successor, Andrew I, but the chronicler Cosmas of Prague's reference to his alleged marriage around 1055 suggests that he may also have survived his second deposition.

Life

Before 1038
Peter was born in Venice, the only son of Doge Otto Orseolo. His mother Grimelda was a sister of Stephen I, the first King of Hungary; historian Gyula Kristó suggests that he was born in 1010 or 1011. The Venetians rose up and deposed Otto Orseolo in 1026. Peter did not follow his father, who fled to the Byzantine court in Constantinople; he instead went to Hungary, where his uncle appointed him commander of the royal army.

Emeric, Stephen's only son to survive infancy, died in an accident in 1031. Stephen's cousin Vazul had the strongest claim to the throne, but the King overlooked him and named Peter as his heir. On Stephen's order, Vazul was blinded shortly thereafter and his three sonsLevente, Andrew and Béla exiled, which strengthened Peter's right of succession. The King asked Peter to take an oath respecting the property of his wife, Queen Giselle, suggesting that Peter's relationship with his aunt was tense.

First rule (1038–1041)
Peter succeeded King Stephen I, who died on 15 August 1038, and adopted an active foreign policy. Hungarian troops plundered Bavaria in 1039 and 1040, and invaded Bohemia in 1040 to assist Duke Bretislav I against Holy Roman Emperor Henry III. Hungarian chronicles recount that Peter preferred the company of Germans ("who roared like wild beasts") and Italians ("who chattered and twittered like swallows"), which made him unpopular among his subjects. He introduced new taxes, seized Church revenue and deposed two bishops.

Audaciously, Peter confiscated Queen Giselle's property and took her into custody. She sought help from Hungarian lords, who blamed one of Peter's favorites (Budo) for the monarch's misdeeds and demanded that Budo be put on trial. When the King refused, the lords seized and murdered his unpopular advisor and deposed the monarch in 1041. They elected a new king, Samuel Aba, who was a brother-in-law or another nephew of King Stephen I.

Exile (1041–1044)
Peter first fled to Austria, seeking the protection of his brother-in-law, Margrave Adalbert. He approached Emperor Henry III for help against Samuel Aba. The new Hungarian monarch invaded Austria in February 1042, but Adalbert routed Aba's troops. Henry III launched his first expedition against Hungary in early 1042. His forces advanced north of the Danube to the river Garam (Hron, Slovakia). The Emperor planned to restore Peter, but the locals were strongly opposed. Accordingly, the Emperor appointed another (unnamed) member of the Hungarian royal family to administer the territories.        

The Emperor returned to Hungary in the early summer of 1044, and was joined in his advance by many Hungarian lords. The decisive battle was fought on 5 June at Ménfő (near Győr), where Samuel Aba's forces were defeated. Although Aba escaped from the battlefield, Peter's supporters soon captured and killed him.

Second rule (1044–1046)
Following Samuel Aba's death, Emperor Henry entered Székesfehérvár and restored Peter. Peter introduced Bavarian law in his realm, which suggests that Hungary became an imperial fief. He accepted the Emperor's suzerainty on Whitsun 1045, giving his royal lance to his overlord (who returned to Hungary). A number of plots to overthrow Peter indicate that he remained unpopular. Two of King Stephen I's maternal cousins (Bolya and Bonyha) conspired against Peter in 1045, but the King had them arrested, tortured and executed. Bishop Gerard of Csanád invited Vazul's exiled sons to the country. An uprising by pagan commoners ended Peter's second rule in 1046.
Peter planned to flee again to the Holy Roman Empire, but Vazul's son Andrew (who had returned to Hungary) invited him to a meeting at Székesfehérvár. The deposed king soon realised that Andrew's envoys actually wanted to arrest him. He fled to a fortified manor at Zámoly, but his opponent's supporters seized it and captured him three days later. All 14th-century Hungarian chronicles attest that Peter was blinded, which caused his death. However, the near-contemporary Cosmas of Prague relates that Judith of Schweinfurt, widow of Duke Bretislaus I of Bohemia who was expelled by her son, fled to Hungary and married Peter about 1055 "as an insult to" her son "and all the Czechs". If the latter report is reliable, Peter survived the ordeal and died during the late 1050s. He was buried in the cathedral of Pécs. His original tomb was excavated in June 2019.

Family
The name and family of Peter's wife are unknown, but Gyula Kristó suggests that she was of German origin. Historians debate the validity of Cosmas of Prague's report of Peter's second marriage to the widowed Judith of Schweinfurt. Lisa Wolverton, the chronicle's translator, says that Cosmas misinterpreted his sources (which describe the marriage of Judith of Swabia to King Solomon of Hungary). On the other hand, Kristó writes that Cosmas's report may suggest that Peter survived his blinding. The following family tree presents Peter the Venetian's ancestors and his relatives who are mentioned in the article:

*A Khazar, Pecheneg or Volga Bulgarian woman.**Samuel Aba might have been Géza's grandson instead of his son-in-law.

See also

Vata pagan uprising

References

Sources

Primary sources

Herman of Reichenau: Chronicle. In: Eleventh-century Germany: The Swabian Chronicles (selected sources translated and annotated with an introduction by I. S. Robinson) (2008); Manchester University Press; .
Cosmas of Prague: The Chronicle of the Czechs (Translated with an introduction and notes by Lisa Wolverton) (2009). The Catholic University of America Press. . 
Simon of Kéza: The Deeds of the Hungarians (Edited and translated by László Veszprémy and Frank Schaer with a study by Jenő Szűcs) (1999). CEU Press. .
The Hungarian Illuminated Chronicle: Chronica de Gestis Hungarorum (Edited by Dezső Dercsényi) (1970). Corvina, Taplinger Publishing. .

Secondary sources

|-

Kings of Hungary
Hungarian Roman Catholics
House of Orseolo
House of Árpád
Hungarian people of Italian descent
1010s births
11th-century deaths
11th-century Venetian people
11th-century Hungarian people